François Nicolas Augustin Feyen, known as Auguste Feyen-Perrin (12 April 1826,  Bey-sur-Seille - 14 October 1888, Paris) was a French painter, engraver and illustrator. He added his mother's maiden name to Feyen to help distinguish himself from his older brother, Jacques-Eugène Feyen, who was already an established artist when Auguste was only fifteen.

Biography 
His father was a tax collector. He had his first art lessons with his older brother, Jacques-Eugène, then attended a drawing school in Nancy. After some private lessons with Michel Martin Drolling, he qualified to enroll at the École des Beaux-arts in 1848, where he studied with Léon Cogniet and Adolphe Yvon.

Specializing in portraits and genre scenes, he had his first exhibition at the Salon in 1853. He continued to exhibit there for most of his life, winning medals in 1865, 1867 and 1874. Once, he gave up the chance to compete for the Prix de Rome to accept a commission painting theater curtains for the Opéra-Comique.

Together with his brother and his friend, Jules Breton, he spent his summers in Cancale; painting scenes from the everyday lives of the Breton peasantry. Many of his works were acquired by public institutions.

He was a close friend of Gustave Courbet and worked with him at two organizations Courbet presided over during the Franco-Prussian War: the Museum Commission and the Federation of Artists, created in 1871 during the Paris Commune. Despite this potentially compromising activity, he maintained his respectability with the Republican establishment and was decorated with the Légion d'Honneur in 1878.

His tomb in Montmartre Cemetery was adorned with a monument by the sculptor, in 1892.

Selected paintings

References

Further reading
 Henry Boucher: "Feyen-Perrin (1826-1888)". Paris 1892. Obituary and text of a speech delivered on the occasion of a monument being erected at Feyen-Perrin's tomb. Boucher was a Senator from Vosges. 
 Jules Breton (ed.): Exposition des œuvres de Feyen-Perrin. March 1889. Alcan-Lévy, Paris.

External links 

 ArtNet: More works by Feyen-Perrin.

1826 births
1888 deaths
Burials at Montmartre Cemetery
19th-century French painters
French male painters
Genre painters
École des Beaux-Arts
French engravers
People from Meurthe-et-Moselle
Recipients of the Legion of Honour
19th-century French male artists